Lists of American football players include:

Professional 

 List of Pro Football Hall of Fame inductees
 List of American Football League players

National Football League

 Current team rosters:
 List of current American Football Conference players
 List of current National Football Conference players
 List of foreign NFL players
 List of NFL players in the Olympics
 List of NFL players by games played
 List of NFL players with chronic traumatic encephalopathy
 List of players selected to the Pro Bowl

College
 List of College Football Hall of Fame inductees (players, A–K)
 List of College Football Hall of Fame inductees (players, L–Z)
 List of Heisman Trophy winners
 List of NCAA Division I FBS field goal leaders
 List of NCAA football records
 List of NCAA Division I FBS quarterbacks with at least 90 career passing touchdowns
 List of NCAA Division I FBS quarterbacks with at least 12,000 career passing yards
 :Category:Lists of National Football League draftees by college football team
 :Category:Lists of college football statistical leaders by team

Other
 List of female American football players
 List of players who have converted from one football code to another